Kilbourne is a surname. Notable people with the surname include:

Ashe Kilbourne, DJ
Amos Kilbourne, English footballer
Charles E. Kilbourne (1872–1963), United States Army general
Edward C. Kilbourne (1856–1959)
Edwin D. Kilbourne (1920–2011), American scientist
Ernest A. Kilbourne (1865–1928), American missionary
James Kilbourne (1770–1850), American surveyor and politician
Jean Kilbourne (born 1943), American writer
Warren Kilbourne (1916–1967), American football player
Wendy Kilbourne (born 1964), American actress